In mathematics, cohomology with compact support refers to certain cohomology theories, usually with some condition requiring that cocycles should have compact support.

Singular cohomology with compact support

Let  be a topological space. Then

Functorial definition

Let  be a topological space and  the map to the point.

Taking for  the constant sheaf with coefficients in a ring  recovers the previous definition.

de Rham cohomology with compact support for smooth manifolds
Given a manifold X, let  be the real vector space of k-forms on X with compact support, and d be the standard exterior derivative. Then the de Rham cohomology groups with compact support  are the homology of the chain complex :

i.e.,  is the vector space of closed q-forms modulo that of exact q-forms.

Despite their definition as the homology of an ascending complex, the de Rham groups with compact support demonstrate covariant behavior; for example, given the inclusion mapping j for an open set U of X, extension of forms on U to X (by defining them to be 0 on X–U) is a map  inducing a map

.

They also demonstrate contravariant behavior with respect to proper maps - that is, maps such that the inverse image of every compact set is compact. Let f: Y → X be such a map; then the pullback

induces a map

.

If Z is a submanifold of X and U = X–Z is the complementary open set, there is a long exact sequence

called the long exact sequence of cohomology with compact support. It has numerous applications, such as the Jordan curve theorem, which is obtained for X = R² and Z a simple closed curve in X.

De Rham cohomology with compact support satisfies a covariant Mayer–Vietoris sequence: if U and V are open sets covering X, then

where all maps are induced by extension by zero is also exact.

See also 
 Borel–Moore homology
 Poincaré duality
 Constructible sheaf
 Derived category

References

Cohomology theories